Camperdown is an area of Dundee, Scotland, best known for Camperdown Park, which is the largest park in the city.

The name is Dutch in origin, being the English version of Kamperduin, a village of the North Holland province (north of Haarlem) on the North Sea coast of the Netherlands. This is because Adam Duncan (1 July 1731 – 4 August 1804), defeated the Dutch fleet off there on 11 October 1797 in the Battle of Camperdown. His home, Camperdown House, was in turn named after this, and then gave its name to the area.

Camperdown Country Park

Camperdown Country Park, often known as  just Camperdown Park, is a public park in the Camperdown area of Dundee. The park is the location of Camperdown House, a wildlife centre and many other recreational facilities. Over 190 species of tree are found in the park. It is located three miles from Dundee city centre.

References

Areas of Dundee